Nubank is a Brazilian neobank and the largest fintech bank in Latin America. Its headquarters are located in São Paulo, Brazil. The company also has engineering offices in Berlin, Germany, Buenos Aires, Argentina, and an office in Mexico City, Mexico.

In December 09, 2021, Nubank officially launched its IPO offering on the NYSE, valuing the company at US$45 billion, making it the most valuable digital neobank.

, Nubank has over 52.4 million customers in Brazil and 1.51 million distributed in Mexico and Colombia.

History
Nubank was founded in 2013 by Colombian David Vélez, Brazilian Cristina Junqueira and American Edward Wible. The first transaction with a Nubank card was made on April 1, 2014. Four years later, Nubank became a unicorn startup with its valuation of US$1 billion.

In the company's first two years of existence, it raised 600 million Brazilian reais. In September 2014, Nubank raised $14.3 million from Sequoia Capital, along with Kaszek Ventures and Nicolas Berggruen. Nubank launched its first financial product, an international Mastercard credit card that has no annuity fees and can be completely managed through a mobile app, and then in June 2015, Nubank led a series B round of investment with Tiger Global Management, along with existing backers Sequoia Capital, Kaszek Ventures and QED Investors.

In 2017, Nubank launched its loyalty program, Nubank Rewards. The program's points (which never expire) can be redeemed for a product catalogue or discounts on services, travel and entertainment. Customers can try the program for free for 30 days, after which they will be charged a fee in order to further use it. In the same year, it also launched its digital account, NuConta.

In October 2018, Tencent bought a minority stake of Nubank worth $180 million ($90 million in capital increase, $90 million in shares). In late 2018, it began offering payments through debit. In 2018, after launching its new credit card design, Nubank was featured in the Guinness Book of Records for making the world's largest unboxing. In early 2019, the fintech started testing personal loans with a few of its digital account users. In May 2019, the company announced it would begin operations in Mexico through a subsidiary called Nu. This was the first time Nubank offered its services and products outside of Brazil.

In January 2020, Nubank made its first acquisition with the purchase of Plataformatec, a company that specialized in software engineering and agile methodologies, thus continuing its growth by including the team of 50 developers of Platformatec. In July of the same year, the company also acquired Cognitect, responsible for Datomic and the Clojure programming language. In September 2020, Nubank acquired Easyinvest, an investment broker also from Brazil, for an undisclosed amount.

In November 2020, Nubank announced that the company would begin operations in Colombia. In April 2021, Edward Wible, who was CTO of the company for 8 years, left his position "to contribute more directly to the construction of the systems and infrastructure of the company" as the Director of Technological Platforms.

The bank completed an IPO in December 2021. After the IPO, Nubank's cofounder Cristina Junqueira became the second woman in Brazil to reach the self-made billionaire status, since she held 2.9% of the stocks  ($1.3 billion). Before and after the IPO, Berkshire Hathaway invested a total of $1 billion dollars in Nubank's stocks.

In 2022, Nubank leads among the best banks of Brazil, by Forbes. The ranking, compiled by Forbes USA, evaluates issues such as customer satisfaction, reliability, digitalization, customer service, and financial advice.

Description
Among the company's products are NuConta (a digital account), an international credit card, both without fees, personal loans, life insurance and investments. The company's differentiating factor is to offer a credit card which is controlled completely through the means of a mobile app. The app allows its users to track transactions in real time, block their respective credit card, apply for a limit raise and contact customer support.

Some of Nubank's investors are Sequoia Capital, Founders Fund, Kaszek Ventures, Tiger Global Management, Goldman Sachs, Berkshire Hathaway, QED Investors and DST Global.

References

External links

Financial services companies of Brazil
Brazilian brands
Companies based in São Paulo
Online banks
Neobanks
2021 initial public offerings
Companies listed on the New York Stock Exchange